British Aerospace (Weybridge) Football Club was an English football club based in Weybridge, Surrey. Playing under various names throughout their history, the club played at Combined Counties Football League level, and featured in the FA Cup and FA Vase. They won the Combined Counties League title four times.

History
As Vickers Armstrong (Surrey), they were members of the Metropolitan & District League during the early 1950s, and were runners-up in 1950–51, their first season. They left the league in 1955. During this period, they participated in the FA Cup, reaching the first qualifying round on two occasions.

They later played in the Surrey Senior League, firstly as BAC Weybridge, and then as British Aerospace (Weybridge) from 1977. Runners-up in the Surrey Senior League in 1977–78, they moved to the Combined Counties Football League (then named the Home Counties League) on its formation the following season. They won the league in its inaugural season, and repeated the feat in 1985–86, 1987–88 and 1988–89.

In 1989 they changed their name to Weybridge Town, but completed only one more season in the Combined Counties League before folding.

Honours

League
Combined Counties Football League
Winners (4): 1978–79, 1985–86, 1987–88, 1988–89

Records
FA Cup best performance: First qualifying round 1946–47, 1949–50 (as Vickers Armstrong)
FA Vase best performance: Third round 1974–75 (as BAC Weybridge)

References

Defunct football clubs in England
Defunct football clubs in Surrey
Surrey Senior League
Combined Counties Football League
Association football clubs established in the 20th century
Association football clubs disestablished in 1990
London League (football)
Works association football teams in England